Mohammed ben Ahmed Abdelghani (18 March 1927 – 22 September 1996) was the prime minister of Algeria under President Chadli Bendjedid from 8 March 1979 until 22 January 1984. Previously the position had been disestablished in 1963.

Biography 

He is an active member of the Algerian People's Party and the Movement for the Triumph of Democratic Liberties. He participates in the events of May 8 1945, in which he is arrested.

Abdelghani was an officer of the Algerian Army, and commanded the 1st Military Region from 1962 to 1964. Many years later, as of 2017, he served the longest consecutive term of any prime minister in Algeria. Abdelghani also served as the interior minister from 1974 to 1980. He died in Algiers.

References

1927 births
1996 deaths
Interior ministers of Algeria